Air Inter Gabon was a scheduled and charter airline based in Port-Gentil, Gabon that has since ended all operations.

History
Air Inter Gabon was founded in 1956 as a subsidiary of Air Gabon. The airline initially operated charter flights, with scheduled flights begun in 1961. The airline's first scheduled route connected Port-Gentil with Lambaréné in Moyen-Ogooué Province. The airline later extended scheduled flights to Fougamou, Gamba, Iguela, Libreville, Mandji, Manega, Mayumba, Mevong, Nkon, Omboue, Ouanga, Setté Cama and Tchibanga. Operations ended in 2001.

References

Defunct airlines of Gabon
Airlines established in 1956
Port-Gentil
1956 establishments in Gabon